Zambia has competed at every edition of the African Games. Its athletes have won a total of 48 medals and 33 of them are bronze.

Medals by Games

Below is a table representing all medals across the Games in which it has competed.

See also 
 Zambia at the Olympics
 Zambia at the Paralympics
 Sports in Zambia

References

External links 
 All-Africa Games index - todor66.com